The 2005 Bromont municipal election took place on November 6, 2005, to elect a mayor and councillors in Bromont, Quebec. Incumbent mayor Pauline Quinlan was re-elected to a third mandate without difficulty.

Results

Paul Rolland has worked with the government of Quebec, including a tenure as cabinet director for the ministry of Municipal Affairs. An experienced municipal politician, he was the only incumbent councillor in Bromont to be re-elected in 2002. He stood down in 2009.

Source: Joshua Bleser, "Pauline Quinlan returned as mayor of Bromont," Sherbrooke Record, 7 November 2005, p. 4.

References

2005 Quebec municipal elections